Rajeni  is a village development committee in Surkhet District in the Bheri Zone of mid-western Nepal. At the time of the 1991 Nepal census it had a population of 2730 people living in 430 individual households.

References

External links
UN map of the municipalities of Surkhet District

Populated places in Surkhet District